Chang Peak is a snow-covered subsidiary peak,  high, on the northeastern slope of Mount Waesche, in the Executive Committee Range, Marie Byrd Land. It was mapped by the United States Geological Survey from surveys and from U.S. Navy trimetrogon photography, 1958–60, and named by the Advisory Committee on Antarctic Names for Feng-Keng (Frank) Chang, Traverse Seismologist at Byrd Station, 1959, and a member of the Marie Byrd Land Traverse Party that explored this area, 1959–60.

References
 

Mountains of Marie Byrd Land
Executive Committee Range